The 2005–06 Texas Longhorns men's basketball team represented The University of Texas at Austin in NCAA Division I intercollegiate men's basketball competition as a member of the Big 12 Conference. The 2005–06 team shared the Big 12 championship, won a then-school-record 30 games, and reached the Elite Eight of the 2006 NCAA tournament.

Roster

Recruiting

Schedule

References 

Texas Longhorns men's basketball seasons
Texas
Texas
2006 in sports in Texas
2005 in sports in Texas